Heve (in its upper course: Bache and Lottmannshardbach) is a river of North Rhine-Westphalia, Germany. Its source is in the Arnsberger Wald near Warstein and it discharges into the Möhnesee.

See also
List of rivers of North Rhine-Westphalia

References

Rivers of North Rhine-Westphalia
Rivers of Germany